The following elections occurred in the year 1875.

 1875 Liberian general election
 1875–1876 New Zealand general election

North America

Canada
 1875 British Columbia general election
 1875 Ontario general election
 1875 Quebec general election

United States
 1875 New York state election
 United States Senate election in New York, 1875

See also
 :Category:1875 elections

1875
Elections